RTV Cazin (RTV C) or Radio Televizija Cazin is a public TV channel founded by Assembly of Cazin municipality. It was established in 1993 (as RTV Cazin) and the program is mainly produced in Bosnian language. Headquarters of RTV Cazin is located in city of Cazin, Bosnia and Herzegovina. Local TV shows promote specific culture, tradition and customs characteristic for the Bosanska Krajina area and whole BIH.

This television channel broadcasts a variety of programs such as local news, documentaries, talk shows, local sports, mosaic and children's program. New Year's program of RTV Cazin (Cazinski nadrealisti) has long been one of the most famous in Bosnia and Herzegovina and by funny skits and original synchronization are known throughout the Balkans and the Bosnian diaspora.

Radio Cazin was established in 1975  and is also part of public municipality services.

References

External links 
 Official website of RTV Cazin
 RTV Cazin in Facebook
 RTV Cazin in YouTube
 Communications Regulatory Agency of Bosnia and Herzegovina

Television channels and stations established in 1993
Television stations in Bosnia and Herzegovina